Pulaski Township is the name of some places in the U.S. state of Pennsylvania:

Pulaski Township, Beaver County, Pennsylvania
Pulaski Township, Lawrence County, Pennsylvania

Pennsylvania township disambiguation pages